Hollywood Today is an American television program that was broadcast on NBC  from January 3, 1955, until September 23, 1955.

Gossip columnist Sheilah Graham was the initial host, with the program running 15 minutes each weekday. Each week featured a celebrity as co-host. During the summer, the show was lengthened to 30 minutes and renamed Hollywood Backstage. Later that summer, Ern Westmore replaced Graham as host. The latter program was sponsored by Charles Antell Inc., advertising its liquid makeup.

Related programs
ABC television broadcast a weekly nighttime version of Hollywood Backstage beginning on August 7, 1955, and ending on September 11, 1955. Westmore was host, with each episode featuring a makeover of a woman selected from the studio audience and a demonstration of how an actress had been made up for a specific role.

On September 26, 1955, The Search for Beauty, with Westmore as host, took over the time slot previously occupied by Hollywood Backstage. Betty Westmore was co-host, with Phil Hanna as assistant and Dick Hageman as announcer. This program also featured celebrity guests and beauty tips for women in the audience. It ended on December 9, 1955.

Westmore had a similar program, The Ern Westmore Show, on ABC-TV in 1953.

References 
 

1955 American television series debuts
1955 American television series endings
1950s American television news shows
NBC original programming
English-language television shows